Huancayo District is one of twenty-eight districts of the province Huancayo in Peru.

See also 
 Hatunqucha
 Kawituyuq
 Waytapallana mountain range
 Yana Uqsha

References

External links